Thanasis Tsigas (born 20 September 1982) is a Greek former footballer, who played as a striker.

Career
He is a professional since 2001 and he played for Paniliakos, Kallithea, PAOK, Panathinaikos and Atromitos. He was the first striker that Larissa signed in for 2008-2009 season. On early August 2009, Panthrakikos expressed their interest on signing Tsigas but he was finally transferred to B' Ethniki Club Kerkyra, with which he climbed to the Superleague.

References

External links
 

1982 births
Living people
Footballers from Alexandroupolis
Greek footballers
Association football forwards
Paniliakos F.C. players
Kallithea F.C. players
Panathinaikos F.C. players
PAOK FC players
Atromitos F.C. players
Athlitiki Enosi Larissa F.C. players
A.O. Kerkyra players
A.O. Glyfada players